Akhmetovo is the name of several rural localities in Russia:
Akhmetovo, Chuvash Republic, a village in Komsomolsky District of the Chuvash Republic
Akhmetovo, Republic of Tatarstan, a village in Nurlatsky District of the Republic of Tatarstan
zheleznodorozhnogo razyezda Akhmetovo, a settlement in Nurlatsky District the Republic of Tatarstan
Akhmetovo, name of several other rural localities